ISO/IEC 8859-12 would have been part 12 of the ISO/IEC 8859 character encoding standard series.

ISO 8859-12 was originally proposed to support the Celtic languages. ISO 8859-12 was later slated for Latin/Devanagari, but this was abandoned in 1997, during the 12th meeting of ISO/IEC JTC 1/SC 2/WG 3 in Iraklion-Crete, Greece, 4 to 7 July 1997. The Celtic proposal was changed to ISO 8859-14, with part 12 possibly being reserved for ISCII Indian.

References 

ISO/IEC 8859